Two Sides of La Lupe, also known as Dos Lados de La Lupe is an album by La Lupe and Tito Puente. It was released by Tico Records in 1968. 

AllMusic gave the album a rating of three stars.

In his book Tropics of Desire, Jose Quiroga wrote that, in Two Sides of La Lupe,  the "dialectical modes are more fully fleshed out." Referring to the cover art, Quiroga posits that the photograph on the left depicts the impish boogaloo singer, while the photograph on the right is her "bolero pose" in which she uses the chair "as a shield for the sexy vulnerability of sadness."

Track listing
Side A
 "Que Bueno Boogaloo" (Lupe Yoli) [2:45]
 "Te Voy a Contar Mi Vida" (Augusto Alguero) [2:00]
 "Going Out of My Head" (Tony Randazzo) [2:42]
 "La Plena Buena" (Paula Raymond) [1:52]
 "Caracas Cuatricentenario" (Lupe Yoli) [1:50]

Side B
 "Si Vuelves Tu" (P. Mauriat, R. Mamoudy) [3:11]
 "Maldito Seas" (Ramon Marrero) [2:28]
 "El Emigrante" (J. Valderama) [2:33]
 "Sin Fe" (B. Capo) [2:18]
 "Cantando" [2:46]

References

1968 albums
Tico Records albums